Elections were held on 12 November 2009 in the province of Gilgit-Baltistan for the first time to elect the first Assembly of Gilgit-Baltistan.

Background 
The region of Gilgit-Baltistan was formerly known as Northern Areas. The Northern Areas were formed by joining Gilgit Agency and Baltistan regions in 1970 but the Northern Areas were ruled directly from Islamabad. In 2009 the Government of Pakistan passed an Autonomy Order known as Gilgit-Baltistan Empowerment and Self-governance Order, 2009 which was signed by the President of Pakistan Asif Ali Zardari in September 2009.

Campaign and Polling 
264 candidates out of which 99 from 10 different political parties and 165 independent candidates contested for 24 seats across Gilgit-Baltistan.

Voting took place on 12 November 2009 on Morning 9 AM to 4 PM without any break. 1022 polling stations were set up across Gilgit-Baltistan out of which 200 polling stations were considered sensitive. 5000 law enforcement personnel was hired for security.

Result
The Pakistan People's Party emerged as the largest party in the assembly by winning 20 seats out of 33. The assembly members took oath on 10 December 2009 and Syed Mehdi Shah became the 1st Chief Minister of Gilgit-Baltistan unopposed.

References

Elections in Gilgit-Baltistan
2009 elections in Pakistan